Tom James is an American politician and surface miner serving as a member of the Wyoming Senate from the 13th district, which includes Sweetwater County.

Career 
Prior to entering politics, James worked as a surface miner for Ciner Wyoming and a switchman for the Union Pacific Railroad. From 2012 to 2018, James served as a welder and machinist in the Oregon Army National Guard. James took office on January 7, 2019 after defeating Democratic incumbent John Hastert in the 2018 general election.

References 

Oregon National Guard personnel
Republican Party Wyoming state senators
Year of birth missing (living people)
Living people
21st-century American politicians